Michelle A. Cameron-Coulter,  (born December 28, 1962, in Calgary, Alberta) is a retired Canadian Olympic synchronized swimmer, and former world champion.

Career
Cameron began synchronized swimming at age 13, and she joined the Calgary Aquabelles in 1976. In 1985 she was paired with swimming partner Carolyn Waldo. The pair found great success, winning most major duet competitions including the 1985 Rome and Spanish Opens, 1986 Commonwealth Games, 1986 World Aquatics Championships and the 1987 Pan Pacific Championships.  Cameron's most notable achievement is earning a gold medal in the women's duet event at the 1988 Summer Olympics. She was the first person from the province of Alberta to win an Olympic gold medal.

Honours
In 1988, she was made a Member of the Order of Canada. In 1991, she was inducted into Canada's Sports Hall of Fame. In 2000, she was inducted into the International Swimming Hall of Fame.

See also
 List of members of the International Swimming Hall of Fame

References

External links
 Canada's Sports Hall of Fame profile
 International Swimming Hall of Fame citation
 CBC Archives: 1988 Seoul: Carolyn Waldo & Michelle Cameron

1962 births
Living people
Canadian synchronized swimmers
Olympic synchronized swimmers of Canada
Synchronized swimmers at the 1988 Summer Olympics
Olympic gold medalists for Canada
Members of the Order of Canada
Swimmers from Calgary
Canadian people of Scottish descent
Olympic medalists in synchronized swimming
Medalists at the 1988 Summer Olympics
World Aquatics Championships medalists in synchronised swimming
Synchronized swimmers at the 1986 World Aquatics Championships
Commonwealth Games medallists in synchronised swimming
Commonwealth Games gold medallists for Canada
Synchronised swimmers at the 1986 Commonwealth Games
Medallists at the 1986 Commonwealth Games